the★tambourines were a Japanese pop band signed to the Giza Studio label, active between 2001 and 2009.

Members
Ami Matsunaga (松永安未) - vocalist,lyricist
Hiroshi Asai (麻井寛史) - bassist, composer, arranger
Toshikazu Kamei (亀井俊和) - drummer
Tatsuya Okada (岡田達也) - engineer

History

2001-2003
In January 2001, the band has formed

In April 2001, they released first single Easy game. The single was included in the Giza Studio's compilation album Giza Studio Masterpiece Blend 2001.

In July 2001, they released second single Hijack brandnew days

In October 2001, they released third single Mayonaka ni Kizuita funny love

In December 2001, vocalist Ami participated in cover album Giza Studio R&B Respect Vol.1: Six Sisters Selection covering You Can't Hurry Love by The Supremes. On 15 December, Ami performed cover song in live house Pan Hill Koujou. DVD footage was released in February 2002.

In February 2002, Mami with Toshikazu started broadcast their own music variety program "AMMY ROAD" on Music 727 Channel.

In March 2002, they've release fourth single Stay Young. In the media it was promoted as an ending theme for Tokyo Broadcasting System Television television program Oujisama no Branch. The single was included in the Giza Studio's compilation album Giza Studio Masterpiece Blend 2002.

In April 2002, they've released first studio album My Back Pages. Album track My back pages was in media promoted as a theme song for YTV television program Asa Ichi!. The album ranked #86 in Oricon Weekly charts and sold 2,750 copies. It was their only album which entered into Top 100 Oricon rankings.

In June 2002, Ami participated in second cover album "GIZA studio MAI-K & FRIENDS HOTROD BEACH PARTY" covering Fun Fun Fun by The Beach Boys. In July, Ami performed this cover song twice in Giza Studio Hotrod Beach Party event in Awaji Yumebutai and Zushi Marina. On November the DVD footage was released. 

In July 2002, after one and half year of debut, their fifth single "Wonder Boy" has ranked first week #99 rank in Oricon rankings. In media it was promoted as an ending theme for Yomiuri TV television program BAN!BOO!Pain!!. The single was included in the Giza Studio's compilation album Giza Studio Masterpiece Blend 2002.

In December 2002, they've released sixth single Atsui Namida. Atsui Namida received special mix in their upcoming studio album under subtitle album mix.

In March 2003, they've released seventh single Afresh Wish. In the media it was promoted as ending theme for Tokyo Broadcasting System Television television program Sanma no Super Karakuri TV. The single was included in the Giza Studio's compilation album Giza Studio Masterpiece Blend 2003.

In April 2003, they've released second studio album Dizzy Season. The album reached #115 on the Oricon charts in its first week. It charted for 2 week and sold more than 3,000 copies.

In July 2003, Ami appeared as a guest in Wag live performance at live house Hills Pan Koujou GIZA studio presents THURSDAY LIVE "ROCK NIGHT".

In August 2003, they've released eighth single Everything is nothing. In the media it was promoted as an ending theme for Yomiuri TV television program Pro no Doumyaku. The single was included in the Giza Studio's compilation album Giza Studio Masterpiece Blend 2003.

In November 2003, they've release third studio album Home Again. It was their last album which enter to Top 200 Oricon Rankings.

2004-2006
In September 2004, they've released ninth single Never ever ~Aki ha Chotto Samishiku~. The single received re-arrangement in upcoming final studio album under subtitle album mix. In the media it was promoted as an ending theme for Nihon TV program Coming Doubt.

In July 2005, they've made guest appearance in "Rina Matsuri 2005 special REHEARSAL NIGHT".

In August 2005, they've released last single "Don't Stop Music". The composer, Aika Ohno self-cover this song in her self cover album. Silent Passage. In the media it was promoted as an ending theme for Tokyo Broadcasting System Television program Azaassu!.

In November 2005 they've released final studio album Sounds Good ~Himekuri Shashin~. The album charted at #270 on the Oricon charts in its first week.

In 2006 they released their first mini album "Instant Vacation". On their official website is included with preview songs and liner notes from members. The album track Ameagari Kirari was in media promoted as an ending theme for Iwate Menkoi Television program Beat Nicks and for Television Saitama program Dream Project Audition TV . The album failed enter to Oricon Weekly Charts.

2007-2009

In September 2007, they've released second mini album 6th Story. It's marked as their 6th album in the general discography history and includes only 6 tracks. The album enter to #286 Oricon Weekly Charts.

In February 2008, they began stream their own radio "the★tambourinesのmorning moka" till March 2009.

In September 2008, they've released their third and final mini album Switch. The mini album also failed enter to Oricon Weekly Charts.

In 2009, after releasing the compilation album My back tracks through official blog they've announced indefinite hiatus.

After hiatus announcement
Until 2011, the remaining members without vocalist kept the official blog active.

In 2012, Hiroshi joined in instrumental band "Sensation" as is active as of 2019.

Toshikazu is working as music teacher of drum in "Giza Musician School and Okada is professor in Osaka University of Arts.

In 2017 their official website has been erased.

Discography
All songs were written by Ami Matsunaga, composed and arranged by Hiroshi Asai. They released ten singles, four studio, three mini and one "best of" albums.

Singles

Studio albums

Mini albums

Compilation album

Magazine appearances
From J-Groove Magazine:
May 2001 Vol.7
June 2001 Vol.8
September 2001 Vol.11
November 2001 Vol.13
December 2001 Vol.14
April 2002 Vol.18
May 2002 Vol.19
August 2002 Vol.22
February 2003 Vol.28
September 2003 Vol.35

From Music Freak Magazine:
April 2001 Vol.77: Easy Game interview
July 2001 Vol.80: Hijack brandnew days Interview
September 2001 Vol.82: Release information
October 2001 Vol.83: Mayonaka ni Kizuita Funny Love Interview
January 2002 Vol.86: New Year Card 
March 2002 Vol.88: Stay Young Interview 
April 2002 Vol.89: My back pages interview and liner notes 
June 2002 Vol.91: Release information
July 2002 Vol.92: Wonder Boy Interview
November 2002 Vol.96: Release information
December 2002 Vol.97: Atsui Namida Interview
February 2003 Vol.99: Release information
March 2003 Vol.100: Afresh Wish interview
July 2003 Vol.104: Everything is nothing interview
October 2003 Vol.107: Release information
November 2003 Vol.108: Home Again interview
August 2004 Vol.117: Never ever interview
July 2005 Vol.128: Release information
August 2005 Vol.129: Don't stop music interview
November 2005 Vol.132: Sounds Good Interview and Liner Notes
July 2006 Vol.140: Release information
August 2006 Vol.141: Instant Vacation Interview and Liner Notes
September 2007 Vol.153: Instant Vacation Interview and Liner Notes
October 2007 Vol.154: 6th Story Interview
August 2008 Vol.162: Instant Vacation Interview and Liner Notes
September 2008 Vol.163: Switch Interview
May 2009 Vol.173: Release information
June 2009 Vol.174: My back tracks Interview

References

External links
Official website
Official blog

Japanese pop rock music groups
Japanese rock music groups
Japanese pop music groups
Being Inc. artists
Living people
Musical groups established in 2001
Musical groups disestablished in 2009
Year of birth missing (living people)